Junior MasterChef Greece is a Greek competitive cooking game show. It is an adaptation of the Australian show Junior MasterChef Australia. It is a spin-off of MasterChef Greece, itself an adaptation of the British show MasterChef, and features contestants aged 8 to 12 in season 1 and in season 2 features contestants aged 8 to 13. The show began airing on 30 November 2011 on Mega Channel. On 13 September 2018 began airing the second season on Star Channel.

Hosts and judges

Series overview

Series synopsis

Season 1 (2011-2012)
The first season of the show began production in June 2011. Over 12,000 children from around the nation auditioned for the series. The show premiered on 30 November 2011 and finished airing on 5 February 2012. It was hosted by Maria Mpekatorou. The judges were Yiannis Loukakos, Lefteris Lazarou and Dimitris Skarmoutsos. The winner was twelve-year-old Lilian Emvaloti.

Contestants
The top 12 contestants were chosen throughout the first week of challenges amongst the Top 40 and the Top 20. The full group of 12 were all revealed on Wednesday, 7 December 2011.

Elimination table

  The concursant is winner
  The concursant is finalist
  Winner of challenge
  High performance
  Medium performance
  Bad performance
  Immunity
  (WT) Red is winner team (LT) Red is loser team
  (WT) Blue is winner team (LT) Blue is loser team
  Third worst performance
  Second worst performance
  Eliminated
  Don't compete in the challenge
  Don't compete

Season 2 (2018)
The second season premiered on 13 September 2018 and finished airing on 24 December 2018 on Star Channel. Over 1,500 children from around the nation auditioned for the second series. The judges were Eleni Psyhouli, Manolis Papoutsakis and Magky Tabakaki. The winner was twelve-year-old Konstantinos Christopoulos.

Contestants
The group of 22 children (11 boys and 11 girls) was revealed in the weekend of Thursday-Friday 20–21 September 2018. The selection was made from 44 children who went through auditions (22 boys and 22 girls).

Notes:
Marios Liontos, eliminated on 5 October with Konstantinos Giovanidis, but he got a second chance on 2 November.
Tonia-Maria Zonia, eliminated on 1 November with Kiki Plakida, but she got a second chance on 2 November.

References

External links
Official website - Star Channel

Mega Channel original programming
Star Channel (Greek TV channel) original programming
2011 Greek television series debuts
Greek reality television series
Greece Junior
Greek television series based on British television series
Television series about children
Television series about teenagers